Australia's Got Talent is an Australian reality television show, based on the original UK series, to find new talent. The third season premiered on the Seven Network on 4 February 2009 and ended on 22 April 2009. The Grand Finale followed the same format as the 2008 one: acts were eliminated in pairs, as well as each judge picking their favourite act to reappear on the show once more. Mark Vincent won the season, while Jal Joshua became the runner-up. 

On the grand finale, international opera singer and winner of Britain's Got Talent series one, Paul Potts performed live in the studio. The season was won by Opera Singer, Mark Vincent, who received $250,000.

The "Order" columns lists the order of appearance each act made for every episode.

Semi-finalists

Semi-final summary
 Buzzed Out |  Judges' choice
 |  |

Semi-final 1

Semi-final 2

Semi-final 3

Semi-final 4

Finals summary

Reception

Viewership

References

Australia's Got Talent
2009 Australian television seasons